Late Night Venture is a post-metal band from Copenhagen, Denmark.

Band history
Late Night Venture was formed in 2005 by the remaining members of the indie/dream pop band Flying Virgins. Originally picking up where F.V. left the band has since developed a heavier and more atmospheric sound.

Discography

Studio albums
 2019 Subcosmos (Czar of Crickets/Virkelighedsfjern)
 2015 Tychonians (Danish Music & Entertainment)
 2012 Pioneers of Spaceflight (Dunk! Records/Oxide Tones)
 2006 Late Night Venture S/T (Quartermain Records)

EP's
 2016 Pilots/Greetings (Virkelighedsfjern)
 2011 Birmingham (Dunk! Records)
 2009 Illuminations EP (Quartermain Records/Planet of Sounds)

As flying virgins
 2004 Lazy Star EP (Quartermain Records)
 2003 Your Spectacular Light (Quartermain Records)

References

External links
Late Night Venture on Facebook
Late Night Venture Bandcamp page
Late Night Venture homepage
Late Night Venture Myspace page

Danish musical groups